(born August 30, 1973) is a Japanese video game artist, producer and director. Currently the head of his own development studio Crim, Takeyasu previously worked at Capcom and their subsidiary Clover Studio before becoming a freelance artist following Clover's dissolution in 2007.

Works

References

External links
 
 

1973 births
Capcom people
Japanese agnostics
Japanese company founders
Japanese illustrators
Japanese video game directors
Japanese video game producers
Living people
People from Osaka
Video game artists